Mary Quade (born October 21, 1971) is an American writer of poetry and nonfiction. In 2003, her poetry collection Guide to Native Beasts won the Cleveland State University Poetry Center First Book Prize, chosen by judge Marilyn Krysl. Her second collection, Local Extinctions, was published in 2016 by Gold Wake Press. She earned her A.B. from the University of Chicago and her M.F.A. from The University of Iowa Writers’ Workshop. Her work has been awarded an Oregon Literary Fellowship (2001) and four Ohio Arts Council Individual Excellence Awards (Poetry 2006, Poetry 2010, Nonfiction 2014, Nonfiction 2020). She is a Professor of English at Hiram College where she teaches creative writing.

Bibliography
 Local Extinctions (Gold Wake Press, 2016)
 Guide to Native Beasts (Cleveland State University Poetry Center, 2004)

Anthologies
 Joyce Dyer, Jennifer Cognard-Black, Elizabeth MacLeod Walls, eds. (2016) From Curlers to Chainsaws: Women and Their Machines. Michigan State University.
 Jen Hirt, Erin Murphy, eds. (2016). Creating Nonfiction: Twenty Essays and Interviews with the Writers. SUNY.
 Okla Elliot, Hannah Stephenson, eds. (2015). New Poetry from the Midwest 2014. New American Press. 
 H.L. Hix, ed. (2008). New Voices: Contemporary Poetry from the United States. Irish Pages.
 Karen Y. Olsen, ed (2005). On the Wing: American Poems of Air and Space Flight.

References

External links
 Author website
 Three poems: AGNI
 Poem: MAYDAY Magazine
 Two poems: Wake: Great Lakes Thought and Culture
 Poem: Devil’s Lake
 Three poems: Barnwood
 Essay excerpt: Flyway: Journal of Writing and Environment
 Poem: Verse Daily
 Poem: In Quire
 Interview: Hayden's Ferry Review
Essay: Broad Street
Essay: Terrain.org
Essay: Blood Orange Review

1971 births
Living people
Iowa Writers' Workshop alumni
American women poets
American essayists
American women essayists
21st-century American poets
21st-century American women writers